Altitude Film Distribution is a British film distribution company, part of the Altitude Film Entertainment group. The parent company was launched in 2012 by Optimum Releasing founder Will Clarke.  Altitude Film Entertainment is vertically integrated, with divisions that handle film production, finance and international sales, as well as UK distribution.

History 
Altitude Film Distribution's first release came in 2014 with the Oscar-winning documentary 20 Feet from Stardom, which was followed by Fruitvale Station and Abel Ferrara's  Welcome to New York. In 2015, Altitude released Ira Sachs' Love Is Strange; a biopic film, Amy, about the British singer Amy Winehouse, which was directed by Asif Kapadia and was released in cinemas on 3 July 2015 in the United Kingdom; international espionage thriller Spooks: The Greater Good; and Narcopolis, a science fiction film. In 2016, they released Bolshoi Babylon, a behind-the-scenes portrait of Moscow's Bolshoi Theatre. On 27 April 2016 it was announced that Altitude would partner with the British Academy Award winning film director Kevin Macdonald, on a new documentary film on Whitney Houston's life and death. It was released in 2018. It's been revealed that the movie is to include rare unheard tracks & performances, with family members & friends to help build up the film through recorded interviews and archive footage.

Filmography

Select cinema releases

Home Entertainment Releases

Altitude Film Entertainment

Altitude Film Entertainment is a British entertainment Company.The company comprises Altitude Film Production led by Will Clarke chairman and joint-CEO with Andy Mayson; Altitude Film Sales with Managing Director Mike Runagall; and Altitude Film Distribution with Managing Director, Hamish Moseley. 

On 21 February 2020, 30West acquired a minority stake in Altitude Film Entertainment. On 4 March that same year, Altitude created Altitude Factual, a unit for natural history documentaries.

References 

Film distributors of the United Kingdom
2014 establishments in the United Kingdom
International sales agents